The National Council of Architectural Registration Boards (NCARB) is a nonprofit corporation comprising the legally constituted architectural registration boards of the 50 states, the District of Columbia, Guam, the Northern Mariana Islands, Puerto Rico, and the U.S. Virgin Islands as its members. Its mission is to collaborate with licensing boards to facilitate the licensure and credentialing of architects to protect the health, safety, and welfare of the public.

NCARB recommends model law, model regulations, and other guidelines for adoption by its member jurisdictions, but each makes its own laws and registration requirements. As a service to its members, NCARB develops, administers, and maintains the Architectural Experience Program (AXP) and the Architect Registration Examination (ARE) as well as facilitates reciprocity between jurisdictions through the NCARB Certificate.

History
Illinois became the first state to enact laws regulating the practice of architecture in 1897. In May 1919, during an American Institute of Architects (AIA) convention in Nashville, TN, 15 architects from 13 states came together to form an organization that would become NCARB. Emil Lorch from Ann Arbor, MI, was elected the organization's first president in May 1920.

As expressed by its founding members, NCARB's stated goals were:
 To facilitate the exchange of information on examining, licensing, and regulating architects
 To foster uniformity in licensing and practice laws
 To facilitate reciprocal licensing
 To discuss the merits of various examining methods as well as the scope and content of licensing examinations
 To strive to improve the general education standards of the architectural profession in the United States

Organization
NCARB is led by a Board of Directors elected by the member registration boards at its Annual Business Meeting each June. It has six officers (president/chair of the Board, first vice president/president-elect, second vice president, treasurer, secretary, and the past president) and eight directors (one from each of the six regions, a member board executive director, and a public director).

Additionally, a chief executive officer, chief operating officer, and chief innovation and information officer lead the headquarters in Washington, DC. Over 100 people are on staff in Washington, DC.

NCARB Regions
Today, NCARB comprises the registration boards from the 50 U.S. states, the District of Columbia, and four U.S. territories (Guam, the Northern Mariana Islands, Puerto Rico, and the U.S. Virgin Islands). These boards are organized into six regions:
 New England: Connecticut, Maine, Massachusetts, New Hampshire, Rhode Island, Vermont
 Middle-Atlantic: Delaware, District of Columbia, Maryland, New Jersey, New York, Pennsylvania, Virginia, West Virginia
 Southern: Alabama, Arkansas, Florida, Georgia, Louisiana, Mississippi, North Carolina, Puerto Rico, South Carolina, Tennessee, Texas, the U.S. Virgin Islands
 Mid-Central: Illinois, Indiana, Iowa, Kentucky, Michigan, Minnesota, Missouri, Ohio, Wisconsin
 Central States: Kansas, Montana, Nebraska, North Dakota, Oklahoma, South Dakota, Wyoming
 Western: Alaska, Arizona, California, Colorado, Guam, Hawaii, Idaho, Nevada, New Mexico, the Northern Mariana Islands, Oregon, Utah, Washington

Services

Each U.S. jurisdiction grants individuals an architectural license. To become licensed, there are three essential components required by most jurisdictions: education, experience, and examination. NCARB maintains licensure candidate and architect records as a service to their customers and their member registration boards. Additionally, NCARB develops and administers the programs most often required to complete jurisdictions’ experience and examination requirements. NCARB also facilitates reciprocity between jurisdictions and acts on behalf of its Member Boards when negotiating international agreements.

Education
Most U.S. jurisdictions require a professional degree from a program that is accredited by the National Architectural Accrediting Board (NAAB). NCARB publishes the NCARB Education Standard as a recommendation to its Member Boards, but requirements often vary between jurisdictions. Those who do not have a degree from a NAAB-accredited program may have their degree evaluated through the NAAB's Education Evaluation Services for Architects (EESA) if they would like to earn an NCARB Certificate. More information on the education requirement can be found in the NCARB Education Guidelines.

Architectural Experience Program

All U.S. jurisdictions accept completion of NCARB's Architectural Experience Program (AXP) to help satisfy their experience requirements. The AXP is a comprehensive training program that was created to ensure that licensure candidates in the architecture profession gain the knowledge and skills required for the independent practice of architecture.

Architect Registration Examination

The Architect Registration Examination (ARE) is required by all U.S. jurisdictions and accepted by 11 Canadian provinces to satisfy examination requirements for licensure. It is a computerized exam that assesses candidates for their knowledge, skills, and ability to provide the various services required to practice architecture independently.

NCARB Record

An NCARB Record is a detailed, verified record of education and training, and is used to establish qualifications for examination, registration, and certification. A licensure candidate must have an NCARB Record to participate in the Architectural Experience Program (AXP), the Architect Registration Examination (ARE), or apply for the NCARB Certificate.

NCARB Certificate

The NCARB Certificate facilitates reciprocal registration among all 55 NCARB Member Boards, and can be used to support an application for registration in other countries including Australia, Canada, Mexico, and New Zealand. Although certification does not qualify a person to practice architecture in a jurisdiction, it does signify that he or she has met the highest professional standards established by the registration boards responsible for protecting the health, safety, and welfare of the public. The standard requirements for the NCARB Certificate are:
 A professional degree from a NAAB-accredited or CACB-accredited program. If educated in a foreign country, one must have their foreign education evaluated by the National Architectural Accrediting Board through the Education Evaluation Service for Architects (EESA).
 Complete the Architectural Experience Program (AXP) training requirements.
 Pass all divisions of the Architect Registration Examination (ARE).
 Receive a license to practice from one of the U.S. registration boards.

There are two alternative ways to earn an NCARB Certificate: the Education Alternative and the Foreign Architect Path to Certification. Earning an NCARB Certificate through one of these alternatives is not accepted by all jurisdictions. Architects interested in earning the NCARB Certificate through one of these programs should verify acceptance with the jurisdiction in which they wish to be licensed prior to pursuing certification.

Education Alternative

Architects who do not hold a professional architecture degree from a NAAB-accredited architecture program are eligible to apply for an NCARB Certificate through the Education Alternative. The alternative includes two pathways: the Two Times AXP option and the NCARB Certificate Portfolio option.

To be eligible for the Two Times AXP option, applicants must:

 Have at least three years of continuous licensure for the last three consecutive years in any U.S. jurisdiction without disciplinary action.
 Hold bachelor's degree in an architecture-related program.
 This is defined as a baccalaureate degree in an architecture-related program from an institution with U.S. regional accreditation (or the Canadian equivalent) that is awarded after earning less than 150 semester credits or the quarter hour equivalent.
 The program must include 60 semester credit hours (90 quarter hours) of coursework in the degree program major.
 We do not have a list of accepted degrees, since the amount of architecturally defined content may vary from institution to institution.

Applicants then document two times the required hours of the Architectural Experience Program (AXP).

To be eligible for the NCARB Certificate Portfolio option, applicants must have at least three years of continuous licensure for the last three consecutive years in any U.S. jurisdiction without disciplinary action, and any education other than a four-year, architecture-related degree. Applicants then create an online portfolio documenting past work experience in all areas of the NCARB Education Standard.

Foreign Architect Path to Certification

The Broadly Experienced Foreign Architect (BEFA) program has been phased out and is no longer available as a path to NCARB certification for foreign architects. Foreign architects who are registered and in good standing in a country outside of the United States or Canada can seek NCARB certification through the Foreign Architect Path to Certification. The program has the following requirements:

 Education: Have a recognized degree or education credential in an architecture program that leads to registration/credential to practice architecture in a foreign country.
 To have one's education verified, one should download the Transcript Request Form, fill in items 1–12 and submit to the academic institution. All transcripts must come directly from the academic institution.
 Foreign Registration: Hold an active registration/licensure credential to practice architecture in a foreign country that has a formal record-keeping mechanism for disciplinary actions in the practice of architecture.
 To have a foreign registration verified, one must download the Credential Verification Form, complete part A, and the credentialing authority must complete part B and submit the final form to NCARB.
 If the country does not have a regulatory body or system for taking disciplinary action, one will need to follow the licensure path for foreign-educated applicants.
 Experience: Complete the AXP. Some foreign experience (up to 1,860 hours) may count toward the AXP requirement, but it will only be possible to complete the AXP outside of the United States if working under an architect licensed in the United States or Canada. If following this path, the AXP's five-year reporting requirement does not apply. Learn more about the AXP.
 Examination: Pass the ARE. ARE divisions can begin to be scheduled after NCARB has verified the transcript and foreign credential and one has paid the Certification application fee.

After these requirements have been documented, NCARB evaluates the applicant's record and issues a certificate.

Continuing Education

NCARB assists architects in keeping their skills and knowledge up-to-date through its Monograph series of self-study courses. The objective of the NCARB monograph and mini-monograph series is to provide a quality continuing education resource, both economical and convenient, that investigates current and emerging topics of interest to practicing architects. The series explores everything from sustainable design to fire safety in buildings to professional conduct to post-occupancy evaluation. All learning units are American Institute of Architects (AIA) Learning Units, and most qualify as Health, Safety, and Welfare (HSW) or Sustainable Design (SD) units.

International Practice

NCARB has established reciprocal registration for architects in the United States, Australia, Canada, Mexico, and New Zealand, and is engaged in similar discussions with additional countries. NCARB also administers the Asia-Pacific Economic Cooperation Architects program in the United States.

See also
Registered Architect
Intern Development Program
National Architectural Accrediting Board
American Institute of Architects
American Institute of Architecture Students
Architect Registration Examination

References

External links
National Council of Architectural Registration Boards

Professional certification in architecture
Architecture organizations based in the United States